Laurelton is an unincorporated community located within Brick Township in Ocean County, New Jersey, United States.

Settlement in the area dates back to the years after 1808, when an iron forge in the area became the nucleus of a community called Burrsville, which was named for one of the proprietors. The area became known as Laurelton in the early 1900s with the opening of Laurelton Farms, a poultry operation run by the Park and Tilford Company.

A failed 1963 referendum would have renamed the entire Brick Township after Laurelton.

References

Brick Township, New Jersey
Unincorporated communities in Ocean County, New Jersey
Unincorporated communities in New Jersey